Eupithecia alexiae is a moth in the family Geometridae. It is found in Kashmir.

The wingspan is about 19 mm. The fore- and hindwings are warm brown.

References

Moths described in 2008
alexiae
Moths of Asia